Teningen is a municipality in the district of Emmendingen, in the state Baden-Württemberg in Germany. It is situated on the river Elz, 15 km north of Freiburg.

Geography

Location 
Teningen is set on the edge of the Black Forest mountain range.

Geology 
The geological subsoil consists of sandstone and limestone and is covered by loess layers of different thickness. The Elz river created alluvial gravel and sand sediments that had been used as pastures but were adapted for agriculture in many cases.

Municipal subdivisions 
The municipality Teningen comprises four districts:  The main town Teningen and the formerly independent towns Heimbach, Köndringen and Nimburg.

Climate
The climate in this area is close to a mediterrean microclimate, and there is adequate rainfall year-round. However, more year-round rain occurs than in the Rhine plateau because of the closeness to the Black Forest.  The Köppen Climate Classification subtype for this climate is "Cfb" (Marine West Coast Climate/Oceanic climate). However, it is close to being humid subtropical (Cfa) due to the mean temperatures in July and August just under 22 °C. The city is close to the Kaiserstuhl, a range of hills of volcanic origin located a few miles away which is considered to be one of the warmest places of Germany and therefore considered as a viticultural area.

Mayors

Friedrich Engler (SPD): 1945-1946
Wilhelm Höfflin (parteilos): 1946–1956
Josef Schmidt (SPD): 1957–1972
Willy Bolz (independent): 1972–1980
Hermann Jäger (SPD): 1980–2009
Heinz-Rudolf Hagenacker (CDU): since 2009

Twin towns
 La Ravoire, France, since 1984
 Zeithain, Germany, since 1990

Sons and daughters of the place
 1603: Johann Conrad Dannhauer, Protestant theologian, professor of eloquence / rhetoric, hermeneutician and poet; † 1666 in Strasbourg
 1807: Wilhelm Theophor Dittenberger, Protestant theologian; † 1871 in Weimar
 1899: Otto Krayer, pharmacologist, opponent against national socialist racism, since 1957 honorary citizen of Köndringen; † 1982 in Tucson / Arizona

References

Emmendingen (district)